Mardik is an Armenian given name. Notable people with the name include:

 Mardik Tchaparian, Lebanese footballer of Armenian descent
 Mardik Martin, American screenwriter of Armenian descent
 Mardik Mardikian, Syrian footballer of Armenian descent

See also 
 Mardikian

Armenian given names